Anita Nyman (born September 15, 1971) is a Finnish cross-country skier who competed from 1993 to 2005. Competing at the 1998 Winter Olympics in Nagano, she finished seventh in the 4 × 5 km relay and 44th in the 5 km + 10 km combined pursuit.

Nyman's finished 26th in the 15 km event at the 1999 FIS Nordic World Ski Championships at Ramsau. Her best World Cup finish was 17th in a 10 km event in Japan in 1997.

Nyman's best individual career finish was third in a 5 km Continental Cup event in Finland in 1995.

Cross-country skiing results
All results are sourced from the International Ski Federation (FIS).

Olympic Games

World Championships

World Cup

Season standings

References

External links

Women's 4 x 5 km cross-country relay Olympic results: 1976-2002 

1971 births
Living people
Cross-country skiers at the 1998 Winter Olympics
Biathletes at the 2002 Winter Olympics
Finnish female cross-country skiers
Olympic cross-country skiers of Finland